Newham North East was a parliamentary constituency represented in the House of Commons of the Parliament of the United Kingdom, in the London Borough of Newham. It returned one Member of Parliament, elected by the first past the post system.

History
The constituency was created for the February 1974 general election, and abolished for the 1997 general election, when it was partly replaced by the new East Ham constituency.

It was one of the most multicultural constituencies in the United Kingdom; the 1991 census showed 53.4% of the constituency was of minority ethnic.

Boundaries
 1974–1983: The London Borough of Newham wards of Castle, Central, Greatfield, Kensington, Little Ilford, Manor Park, St Stephens, Wall End, and Woodgrange
 1983–1997: The London Borough of Newham wards of Castle, Central, Greatfield, Kensington, Little Ilford, Manor Park, Monega, St Stephens, and Wall End

Members of Parliament

Elections

Elections in the 1970s

Elections in the 1980s

Elections in the 1990s

Note: Immediately prior to the election Kellaway announced that he was leaving the Liberal Democrats and joining the Labour Party. Consequently, there was no official Liberal Democrat standing in the election

Notes and references

Parliamentary constituencies in London (historic)
Constituencies of the Parliament of the United Kingdom established in 1974
Constituencies of the Parliament of the United Kingdom disestablished in 1997
Politics of the London Borough of Newham